Betty K. Koed is the current Historian of the United States Senate. She is the third person to hold that position and the first woman to do so.

Koed graduated from the University of California, Santa Barbara in 1983 and received a bachelor's in English. She went on to earn her master's and PhD in history, also from University of California, Santa Barbara, in 1991 and 1999 respectively, after beginning her career as a technical writer. While pursuing her PhD, Koed studied with Otis L. Graham Jr. and Robert Kelley at the University of California, Santa Barbara.

She later went on to teach American History at the University of California, Santa Barbara before joining the Senate Historical Office in 1998.

Koed won the Distinguished Alumni Award from UC Santa Barbara in 2016.

References

External links

Profile on American Historical Association

21st-century American historians
Employees of the United States Senate
Living people
University of California, Santa Barbara alumni
Year of birth missing (living people)
Historians of the United States Senate